The Real McCall: An American Storyteller is an album by country musician C. W. McCall, released on American Gramaphone in 1990 (see 1990 in music) and rereleased in 1999 (see 1999 in music). It features revamped digital versions of some of McCall's better known songs, including "Convoy", "Wolf Creek Pass" and "Black Bear Road", rerecorded by the artist for the album. It contains more songs than any other release by the artist, with sixteen tracks in total. It features songs from most of McCall's albums, the exceptions being his later works, C. W. McCall & Co. and Roses for Mama. One new track, "Comin' Back for More", telling the story of the infamous American cannibal Alferd Packer, was recorded for the album and serves as its opener. Songwriting on the album is credited to lyricist Bill Fries (the real name of C. W. McCall) and composer Chip Davis, who together have created nearly all original songs by McCall throughout the history of the character.

Track listing
 "Comin' Back for More" (Bill Fries, Chip Davis) – 3:51
 "Ghost Town" (Fries, Davis) – 3:59
 "Glenwood Canyon" (Fries, Davis) – 3:26
 "There Won't Be No Country Music" (Fries, Davis) – 3:50
 "Roy" (Fries, Davis) – 0:40
 "The Little Brown Sparrow" (Fries, Davis) – 4:34
 "Wilderness" (Fries, Davis) – 3:19
 "Aurora Borealis" (Fries, Davis) – 4:11
 "The Silverton" (Fries, Davis) – 3:51
 "Wolf Creek Pass" (Fries, Davis) – 3:58
 "Night Rider" (Fries, Davis) – 2:34
 "Rocky Mountain September" (Fries, Davis) – 3:39
 "Black Bear Road" (Fries, Davis) – 2:08
 "Camp Bird Mine" (Fries, Davis) – 3:33
 "Convoy" (Fries, Davis) – 3:50
 "Columbine" (Fries, Davis) – 5:08

Personnel

 C. W. McCall – Vocals, Jacket Concept
 Liz Westphalen, Pam Kalal, Denise Fackler, LynnDee Mueller, Jackson Berkey, Doug Fackler, Jim Kalal – Background Vocals
 Chip Davis – Background Vocals, Drums, Percussion, Keyboards, Producer, Jacket Concept
 Jackson Berkey – Keyboards
 Eric Hansen – Bass, Trumpet
 Steve Hanson – Banjo
 Ron Cooley – Guitars
 Willis Ann Ross – Flute
 Bob Jenkins – Oboe
 Mary Walter – Harp
 Wayne Jesz – Percussion, Engineering Assistant, Mastering
 Arnie Roth – Concert Master
 Ruben Gonzalez, Samuel Magad, Everett Mirsky, Peter Labella, Edgar Muenzer, Thomas Yang, Florentina Ramniceanu, Joseph Golan, Helen Nightengale, Steve Shipps, Clara Lindner, Thomas Hall, Gail Salvatori, Ronald Satkiewicz – Violin
 Oatakar Sroubek, Danial Strba, Robert Swan, John Bartholomew, Roger Moulton, Martin Abrams, Marlou Johnston – Viola
 Barbara Haffner, Lenny Chausow, Phillip Blum, Judith Stone, Felix Wurman, Mark Lekas – Cello
 Dale Clevenger, Alice Render Clevenger, Richard Oldberg, David Kappy – French Horn
 Joseph Guastafeste, Collins Trier, Virginia Dixon, Gregory Sarchet – Bass
 George Vosburgh – Trumpet
 Ed Kocher, Arthur Linsner, Charlie Vernon – Trombone
 Dale Hoaglan – Locomotive Whistle

Additional personnel

 John Boyd – Recording, Mixing
 Bill Bradley – Strings and Bass Engineering
 Arnie Roth – Orchestral Conducting
 Brian Ackley, John Armstrong – Engineering Assistants
 Louis J. Stout, Jr. – Orcherstral Assistant
 Louis F. Davis, Sr. – Keyboard Technician
 Hirsch Design – Art Production

External links
 NarrowGauge.org album information for The Real McCall: An American Storyteller

C. W. McCall albums
1990 albums